The Nagpur metropolitan area or Greater Nagpur is a metropolitan area in Indian state of Maharashtra.

History 
In 1999, a notification was sent out by the State of Maharashtra announced the Nagpur Metropolitan Area, comprising Nagpur City, Nagpur Gramin, Hingna, Parshivni, Mauda, Kamptee taluka and parts of Savner, Kalmeshwar, Umred and Kuhi talukas. The boundaries of the metro region around the municipal corporation limits of the city were described, and the Mumbai metropolitan area and Pune metro areas were declared.

Later on a notification dt. 24 December 2002, the government extended the jurisdiction of NIT outside the NMC limit under clause 1(2) of NIT Act-1936 as "Nagpur Metropolitan Area"  in connection to notification of 1999 which ranges approximately 25 to 40 km area away from NMC limit.

Objectives of metro region planning

Laying down broad policies and directions of growth in the principal zones
Determining the hierarchy of roads and access ways in coordination with existing roads proposed D. P. roads
Establishing the zoning of land use on the lands falling within 25 to 40 km are of the township
Determining the standards for common facilities like education health and social facilities for the resident population
Ensuring planned development in fringe areas

Planning area under metro region

Two phases of proposed metro region
NIT proposed the metro region plan in two phases:

Phase I: Area - 1520 km2 (i.e. boundary of R. P.)
Phase II: Area - 2260 km2

NIT is framing the policy for metro region planning and once the plan is finalised, different town planning schemes will be taken up for development.

References

External links

Nagpur
Metropolitan areas of India